Michael Warton (23 October 1593 – 1645) was an English politician who sat in the House of Commons  between 1640 and 1644. He fought and died on the Royalist side in the English Civil War.

Warton was the son of Sir Michael Warton and his wife Elizabeth Hansby, daughter of Sir Ralph Hansby.
 
In April 1640, Warton was elected Member of Parliament for Beverley in the Short Parliament. He was re-elected in November 1640 for the Long Parliament and sat until he was disabled from sitting in parliament in 1644 for supporting the King. Warton was killed in 1645 by a cannon shot at the Great Siege of Scarborough Castle which was a garrison for the King.

Warton married to Catherine Maltby daughter of Christopher Maltby  at Cottingham on 1 October 1620.

References

External links
Pedigree of Warton of Beverley

1593 births
1645 deaths
English MPs 1640–1648
People killed in the English Civil War
Cavaliers